Mu-Tao Wang is a Taiwanese mathematician and current Professor of Mathematics at Columbia University.

Education
He entered National Taiwan University in 1984, originally for international business, but after a year he switched to mathematics.  He earned his BS in Mathematics at National Taiwan University in 1988 and his MS from the same institution in 1992. He received a PhD in Mathematics in 1998 from Harvard University with a thesis entitled "Generalized harmonic maps and representations of discrete groups." His thesis adviser at Harvard was Chinese Fields Medalist and differential geometer Shing-Tung Yau.

Career
Wang joined the Columbia faculty as an assistant professor in 2001, and was appointed full professor in 2009. Before joining the faculty at Columbia, Wang was Szego Assistant Professor at Stanford University.

He was a Sloan Research Fellow from 2003–2005. In 2007, he was named a Kavli Fellow of the National Academy of Sciences and was awarded the Chern Prize. Wang is a Fellow of the American Mathematical Society and won the Morningside Gold Medal of Mathematics in 2010.

In 2010, Wang delivered the plenary address at the International Congress of Chinese Mathematicians, and was plenary speaker at the International Congress on Mathematical Physics. In addition, he was also plenary speaker at the International Conference on Differential Geometry in 2011.

After winning the Morningside Medal, Wang told interviewers that he did not consider himself a particularly good student and did not consistently make good grades. He struggled with studying topics which did not interest him just for the grade, but spends a lot of time on subjects which interested him. He credits his career in mathematics to two people: his mother and his thesis adviser Shing-Tung Yau. He cites his mother's support and understanding of his decision to switch to mathematics in university despite it being a much less lucrative field, and describes meeting Yau in 1992 as the pivotal point in his life when he decided to make mathematics research his primary focus.

Work
Wang's research is focused in the fields of differential geometry and mathematical physics, specifically general relativity. He has studied higher co-dimensional mean curvature flow extensively, leading to criteria relating to the flow's existence, regularity, and convergence. In the field of general relativity, he is especially known for his work on quasilocal mass-energy; the Wang-Yau quasi-local mass is named in his honor.

Selected bibliography 
"A fixed point theorem of isometry action on Riemannian manifolds", Journal of Differential Geometry 50 (1998), no. 2, 249-267
"Mean curvature flow of surfaces in Einstein four-manifolds", Journal of Differential Geometry 57 (2001), no. 2, 301-338
"Long-time existence and convergence of graphic mean curvature flow in arbitrary codimension", Inventiones Mathematicae 148 (2002), no. 3, 525-543
(with Knut Smoczyk) "Mean curvature flows of Lagrangian submanifolds with convex potentials", Journal of Differential Geometry 62 (2002), no. 2, 243-257
"The Dirichlet problem for the minimal surface system in arbitrary codimension", Communications on Pure and Applied Mathematics 57 (2004), no. 2, 267-281
(with Shing-Tung Yau) "Isometric embeddings into the Minkowski space and new quasi-local mass", Communications in Mathematical Physics 288 (2009), no. 3, 919-942
(with Ivana Medoš) "Deforming symplectomorphisms of complex projective spaces by the mean curvature flow", Journal of Differential Geometry 87 (2011), no. 2, 309-342
(with Simon Brendle and Pei-Ken Hung) "A Minkowski type inequality for hypersurfaces in the Anti-de Sitter-Schwarzschild manifold", Communications on Pure and Applied Mathematics
(with Po-Ning Chen and Shing-Tung Yau) "Quasilocal angular momentum and center of mass in general relativity", arXiv:1312.0990

References

External links 

Year of birth missing (living people)
Living people
Columbia University faculty
Differential geometers
Fellows of the American Mathematical Society
Harvard Graduate School of Arts and Sciences alumni
Mathematical physicists
National Taiwan University alumni
20th-century Taiwanese mathematicians
21st-century Taiwanese mathematicians